Foreign exchange regulation is a form of financial regulation specifically aimed at the Forex market that is decentralized and operates with no central exchange or clearing house. Due to its decentralized and global nature, the foreign exchange market has been more prone to foreign exchange fraud and has been less regulated than other financial markets.

However, some countries do regulate forex brokers through governmental and independent supervisory bodies, for example, the National Futures Association and the Commodity Futures Trading Commission in the US, the Australian Securities & Investments Commission in Australia, and the Financial Conduct Authority in the UK. These bodies act as watchdogs for their respective markets and provide financial licenses to organizations that comply with local regulations.

Objective

The objective of regulation is to ensure fair and ethical business behaviour. In their turn all foreign exchange brokers, investment banks and signal sellers have to operate in compliance with the rules and standards laid down by the Forex regulators. Typically they must be registered and licensed in the country where their operations are based.  Licensed brokers may be subject to recurrent audits, reviews and evaluations to check that they meet the industry standards. Foreign exchange brokers may have capital requirements which require them to hold a sufficient amount of funds to be able to execute and complete foreign exchange contracts concluded by their clients and also to return clients’ funds intact in case of bankruptcy.

Each Forex regulator operates within its own jurisdiction and regulation and enforcement varies significantly from country to country.  In the European Union a license from one member state covers the whole continent under the Mifid regulation and has resulted in regulatory arbitrage where companies select the EU country that imposes the least controls such as CySEC in Cyprus. Not all foreign exchange brokers are regulated and many will register in jurisdictions that impose low-regulatory environments such as tax havens and corporate havens that form part of offshore banking.

Main regulatory requirements
Client conduct - These insure brokers cannot make unrealistic or misleading claims or promises. It also prevents brokers from advising clients to take risky trade decisions or to enter into positions that are not in their best interest.

Segregation of client funds - These restrictions ensure that the broker can not use any of the clients funds for its operational or other expenses. This regulation requires that all deposits be maintained separately from the broker’s bank accounts.

Reporting and disclosure - These rules insure the broker’s clients are well informed of the status of their account and the risks associated with FOREX products.

Leverage limits - These limits ensure clients maintain an acceptable risk level. As such, firms may not offer increasingly higher leverage to consumers (e.g. 1:1000).

Minimum capital requirements - These restrictions ensure that clients can withdraw their funds at any time including in the event of bankruptcy of the broker.

Audit - Periodic auditing assures the broker financial risk is tolerable and there is no misappropriation of funds. To this end, brokers must submit periodic financial and capital adequacy statements.

Regulatory Bodies by Country

Europe 

  - The Financial Services and Markets Authority, FSMA
  - Financial Supervision Commission of Bulgaria, FSC Bulgaria
  - Croatian Financial Services Supervisory Agency, CFSSA
  - Cyprus Securities and Exchange Commission (CySEC)
  - Czech National Bank, CNB
  - Danish Financial Supervisory Authority, Danish FSA
  - The Financial Supervision Authority
  - FIN-FSA in Finland
 :
 Autorité des marchés financiers, AMF,
 Banque de France,
 Credit Institutions and Investment Firms Committee, CECEI, and
 French Autorité de Contrôle Prudentiel et de Résolution, ACPR
  - Federal Financial Supervisory Authority, BaFin
  - The Hellenic Capital Market Commission, HCMC
  - Hungarian Financial Supervisory Authority, HFSA
  - The Financial Supervisory Authority, FME
  - The Central Bank of Ireland
  - The Financial Supervision Commission (FSC)
  - Commissione Nazionale per le Società e la Borsa, CONSOB
  - The Financial and Capital Market Commission, FKTK
 :
 The Lithuanian Securities Commission, and
 Bank of Lithuania
  - The Financial Market Authority Liechtenstein, FMA
  - Commission de Surveillance du Secteur Financier, CSSF
  - Malta Financial Services Authority (FSA in Malta)
  - The Financial Supervisory Authority of Norway
  - Polish Financial Supervision Authority, PFSA
  - Comissão do Mercado de Valores Mobiliários (CMVM)
  - Romanian Financial Supervisory Authority, ASF
 :
 FCFR in Russia, and
 Centre for Regulation of Off-Exchange Financial Instruments and Technologies, CRFIN
  - National Bank of Slovakia, NBS
  - Comisión Nacional del Mercado de Valores
  - Swedish Financial Supervisory Authority, Swedish FSA
 :
 Swiss Financial Market Supervisory Authority, FINMA,
 Association Romande des Intermediares Financiers (ARIF),
 Organisme d'autorégulation fondè par le GSCGI, L'OAR-G,
 PolyReg General Self-Regulatory Organisation,
 Swiss Bankers Association, SBA,
 Swiss Federal Banking Commission, SFBC,
 Swiss Federal Department of Finance, SFDF,
 Swiss Federal Finance Administration, SFFA,
 Swiss National Bank, SNB
 :
 UK Financial Services Authority (FSA UK),
 The Financial Conduct Authority (FCA),
 The Prudential Regulation Authority (PRA),
 Financial Services Compensation Fund (FSCS)

Asia 

 :
 State Committee for Securities, and
 Baku Stock Exchange
  - Securities and Exchange Commission, SEC (বাংলাদেশ সিকিউরিটিজ অ্যান্ড এক্সচেঞ্জ কমিশন)
  - China Securities Regulatory Commission, CSRC (Chinese: 中国证监会为国)
 , Dubai:
 Dubai Multi Commodities Centre, DMCC,
 Dubai Gold & Commodities Exchange, DGCX,
 Dubai Financial Services Authority, DFSA, and
 Emirates Securities and Commodities Authority, SCA
  - Securities and Futures Commission (Chinese: 證券及期貨事務監察委員會)
 :
 Securities and Exchange Board of India, SEBI, and
 Reserve bank of India, RBI
  - Commodity Futures Trade Regulatory Agency, CoFTRA (Indonesian: Bursa Komoditi dan Derivatif Indonesia)
  - The Israel Securities Authority, ISA
 :
 Financial Services Agency of Japan, FSA Japan,
 Japan Securities Dealers Association, JSDA,
 Japan Investor Protection Fund, JIPF (j), and
 Tokyo Commodity Exchange, TOCOM
 :
 Ministry of Commerce and Industry in Kuwait, and
 Kuwait Chamber of Commerce & Industry, KCCI
  - Bank of Lebanon
  - Securities Commission Malaysia (Malaysian: Suruhanjaya Sekuriti Malaysia)
  - Securities and Exchange Commission of Pakistan, SECP
 :
 Securities and Exchange Commission Philippines (филип. Komisyon sa mga Panagot at Palitan), and
 The Bangko Sentral ng Pilipinas
 :
 Monetary Authority of Singapore, MAS (Chinese: 新加坡金融管理局), and
 Singapore Exchange, SGX (Chinese: 新加坡交易所)
  - Financial Supervisory Commission (Geumnyung Wiwonhoe)
  - Securities and Exchange Commission of Sri Lanka
  - Securities and Exchange Commission
  - Capital Markets Board, SPK

North and Middle America

North America 

 :
 British Columbia Securities Commission (BCSC),
 Canadian Investor Protection Fund (CIPF),
 Financial Transactions and Reports Analysis Center of Canada (FINTRAC),
 Investment Industry Regulatory Organization of Canada (IIROC),
 Ontario Securities Commission (OSC), and
 Ombudsman of Banking Services and Investments (OBSI)
 :
 Commodity Futures Trading Commission (CFTC),
 Financial Industry Regulatory Authority (FINRA),
 National Futures Association (NFA),
 U.S. Securities and Exchange Commission (U.S. SEC),
 Chicago Board of Trade (CBOT), and
 Securities Investor Protection Corporation (SIPC)

Middle America 

  - Anguilla Financial Services Commission
  - Eastern Caribbean Securities Regulatory Commission (ECSRC)
  - International Financial Services Commission (IFSC)
  - BVI Financial Services Commission (FSC of BVI)
  - The Cayman Islands Monetary Authority (CIMA)
  - Financial Services Unit (FSU)
 :
 The Securities Market Superintendence, SMV,
 Ministry of Industry and Commerce, MICI -
  - The Financial Services Authority (FSA)

Africa 

  - Autorité Marocaine du Marché des Capitaux (AMMC)
  - The Capital Markets Authority (CMA)
  - The Financial Services Commission (FSC Mauritius)
  - The Securities and Exchange Commission (SEC)
 :
 Seychelles Financial Services Authority (FSA Seychelles), and
 Seychelles Licensing Authority (SLA)

Australia and Oceania 

  - Australian Securities & Investments Commission (ASIC)
 :
 Financial Markets Authority (FMA),
 Financial Service Providers Register (FSPR), and
 Financial Services Complaints Limited (FSCL).

References

Foreign exchange market
Financial regulation